

Box office

Released

See also
 List of Punjabi films of 2021
 List of Punjabi films
 2022 in film

References

External links

2022
Films
Punjabi